At Midnight may refer to:

 @midnight, or At Midnight, a Comedy Central series hosted by Chris Hardwick
 At Midnight (1913 film), an American short silent film
 At Midnight (2023 film), an American romantic comedy film 
 At Midnight (EP), a 2019 release by American contemporary worship band Elevation Worship
 "At Midnight (My Love Will Lift You Up)", a 1977 song by R&B/funk band Rufus featuring Chaka Khan
 "At Midnight", a 1989 song by the Mighty Lemon Drops from the album Laughter

See also

 
 
 After Midnight (disambiguation)
 Before Midnight (disambiguation)